Arispe cestalis is a species of snout moth. It is found in North America, including Colorado and California.

References

Moths described in 1886
Pyralini
Moths of North America